JP MacCallum (born March 3, 1975 in Halifax, Nova Scotia) is a Canadian ice hockey coach. He is currently serving as head coach of the Herlev Eagles in the Metal Ligaen, Denmark’s top league.

Career 
MacCallum played varsity ice hockey at Union College in Schenectady, New York, USA, and at Saint Mary's University in Halifax, Nova Scotia, Canada. Studying biology (major) and English (minor), he developed an expertise in training and particularly in strength training for hockey players. He became a full-time trainer with his own performance training business in 2000 and especially works with athletes in off-season, including Alex Grant, Brad Marchand and Andrew Bodnarchuk,. In 2004, he was named assistant coach at Saint Mary’s and stayed on the job until 2007.

MacCallum took up an offer from Dunaújváros AC, a professional club from Hungary, to become their assistant coach. After serving in that position during the 2008-09 season, he was promoted to head coach in 2009 and remained in that job until 2011. While in Hungary, he also worked for the Hungarian ice hockey federation, serving as head coach of the country’s under-20 national team and as assistant coach of the men’s national team, which included an appearances at the 2012 World Hockey Championships (Division 1, Group A) in Slovenia.

In 2012, MacCallum was signed by the Tohoku Free Blades of Japan. He served as an assistant coach for two years and then took over head coaching duties in 2014. In his single season at the helm, he guided the Free Blades to the Asia League Championship title.

In March 2016, he was named head coach of the Herlev Eagles of Denmark’s top-flight Metal Ligaen.

References

External links 
 Personal website (Archived)
 Profile at eliteprospects.com
 J.P. MacCallum Q&A

Canadian ice hockey coaches
Ice hockey people from Nova Scotia
Japanese ice hockey coaches
Sportspeople from Halifax, Nova Scotia
1975 births
Living people